WCVU (104.9 FM) is a radio station broadcasting a mix of soft oldies and soft adult contemporary formats. It is licensed to Solana, Florida, United States.  The station is owned by iHeartMedia, Inc., through licensee iHM Licenses, LLC, and features programming from Fox News Radio.

History

The station went on the air as WMMY on March 16, 1990.  On February 15, 1991, the station changed its call sign to WQOL; on March 3, 1991, to WMMY; and on September 25, 1995, to the current WCVU/

References

External links

CVU
Soft adult contemporary radio stations in the United States
Radio stations established in 1990
1990 establishments in Florida
IHeartMedia radio stations